was the lead ship in the  of protected cruisers of the Imperial Japanese Navy. Like her sister ships, ( and ) the name Itsukushima comes from one of the traditional Three Views of Japan, in this case, the Itsukushima Shrine in Hiroshima prefecture on the Seto Inland Sea, home to a famous Shinto shrine dedicated to the goddess Benzaiten.

Background
Forming the backbone of the Imperial Japanese Navy during the First Sino-Japanese War, the Matsushima-class cruisers were based on the principles of Jeune Ecole, as promoted by French military advisor and naval architect Louis-Émile Bertin. The Japanese government did not have the resources or budget to build a battleship navy to counter the various foreign powers active in Asia; instead, Japan adopted the radical theory of using smaller, faster warships, with light armor and small caliber long-range guns, coupled with a massive single  Canet gun. The design eventually proved impractical, as the recoil from the huge cannon was too much for a vessel of such small displacement, and its reloading time was impractically long; however, the Matsushima-class cruisers served their purpose well against the poorly equipped and poorly led Imperial Chinese Beiyang Fleet.

Itsukushima was built by the Société Nouvelle des Forges et Chantiers de la Méditerranée naval shipyards at La Seyne-sur-Mer, in France, and was launched on 18 June 1889. She underwent trials by the builder in September and October, and achieved an average maximum speed of 16.78 knots on 15 October 1890.

Design

Itsukushima differed from her sister ship Hashidate primarily in that her windows were square instead of rectangular, and in that Hashidate had a stronger engine.

Itsukushima had a steel hull with 94 frames constructed of mild steel, and a double bottom, divided into waterproof compartments, with the area between the bulkheads and armor filled with copra. The bow was reinforced with a naval ram. The vital equipment, including boilers and ammunition magazines, were protected by hardened steel armor, as were the gun shields. The maximum rate of fire was two rounds per hour, and the ship carried 60 rounds. Ten were mounted on the gun deck, five to each side, with the eleventh gun located on the upper deck of the fantail. Each gun was equipped with 120 rounds. Each gun had 300 rounds. In addition, eleven QF 3 pounder Hotchkiss were mounted at various locations, with range of  rate of fire of 32 rounds/minute and 800 rounds per gun. Each ship in the class also had four  torpedo tubes, three in the bow and one in the stern, with a total of 20 torpedoes carried on board. The weight of all of this weaponry led to the design becoming dangerously top-heavy, and armor was sacrificed in an effort to reduce weight.

The ship was driven by two horizontal triple expansion steam engines. However, the design had problems with seaworthiness, and the design speed was seldom attained in operation.

Service record

Itsukushima was accepted by the Imperial Japanese Navy on 3 September 1891, and departed Toulon for Japan on 12 November. However, during the voyage, her tube boilers began to leak profusely, and she had to be repaired in Colombo Ceylon by a repair team sent from France. She was only able to depart Colombo on 18 April 1892, arriving at Kure Naval District on 21 May 1892.

First Sino-Japanese War
As one of the most modern vessels in the Imperial Japanese Navy, Itsukushima became part of the main Japanese fleet under Vice Admiral Itō Sukeyuki, and participated in the 17 September 1894 Battle of the Yalu River. During the battle, she was able to fire her Canet gun only five times, hitting the Chinese flagship  four times and  once, without creating appreciable damage to either vessel. In return, she took eight hits, including one to her engine room, bow torpedo room and one which severed her main mast. In the encounter, she suffered 15 killed and 17 wounded.

Afterwards, Itsukushima was assigned to protect convoys transporting troops and equipment to Manchuria and saw combat again at the Battle of Weihaiwei of 9 February 1895. During this battle, she was hit by a dud shell from one of the Chinese coastal batteries, which did not cause any significant damage.

Interwar years

Itsukushima was among warships anchored in the Seto Inland Sea off Nagahama, Shikoku, Japan, when a strong gale struck on 29 October 1897.  The central battery ironclad 's anchor chain broke, and Fusō drifted across the harbor, collided with the ram of Itsukushimas sister ship  and then struck Itsukushima before sinking in shallow water on a reef. Fusō later was refloated, repaired, and returned to service.

Itsukushima was reclassified as a second-class cruiser on 21 March 1898. Her 37 mm guns were also replaced by six Maxim guns in 1900.

During the Boxer Rebellion, Itsukushima was assigned to Shanghai to help protect Japanese civilians and interests.

On 25 February 1901, Itsukushima and Hashidate departed Yokosuka on a training tour which took them to Manila, Batavia, Hong Kong, Chelumpo, Pusan, Gensan, and Vladivostok, returning to Yokosuka on 14 August 1901. On her return, she was overhauled, with her boilers replaced by more reliable Belleville boilers, and her smaller armament replaced by two 76 mm guns and 18 QF 3 pounder Hotchkiss 47 mm guns.

In March 1903 it was announced that Itsukushima, together with Hashidate (flagship) and Matsushima had departed Yokosuka 15 February 1903 on a further training tour which would take them to Hong Kong, Singapore, Batavia, Perth, Adelaide, Melbourne, Sydney, Wellington, Auckland, Sydney, Townsville, Thursday Island, Manila, Amoy, and Fusan. This tour was of great significance in Australia, being the first visit of the Japanese fleet since the 1887 visit for the jubilee of Queen Victoria in 1887, further the ships were now fitted with Marconi wireless telegraphy equipment and its use there was amongst the earliest in Australia. The ship's crew included Captain K. Matsumoto, vice-captain Tetsutaro Sato, paymaster Koshi Tomchiro and assistant paymaster Tsuruyo Furusawa. Captain Matsumoto was comprehensively interviewed by a Perth journalist while awaiting the arrival of the flagship.

Further training cruises were undertaken in 1906, 1907, and 1914.

Russo-Japanese War
During the Russo-Japanese War, the obsolete Itsukushima and her sister ships were assigned to the 5th squadron of the reserve IJN 3rd Fleet, together with the equally outdated ironclad battleship  under the command of Admiral Kataoka Shichirō. Despite the limited capability of his ships, Admiral Kataoka was assigned to support the blockade of Port Arthur by patrols and escorts in the Korea Strait starting in February 1904 based out of the Takeshiki Guard District on Tsushima island. During May, Itsukushima covered the landings of the Japanese First Army and Japanese Second Army in Manchuria.

On 10 August 1904, Itsukushima was under repairs and could not take part in the Battle of the Yellow Sea, but was in position to monitor the return of the Russian fleet to Port Arthur. Itsukushima remained stationed at the entrance to Port Arthur until the Russian surrender in January 1905.  After the fall of Port Arthur, on 8 February, Itsukushima returned to Kure Naval Arsenal for repairs, which took until 22 March. On 5 April, she was back on station in the Korea Strait.

At the time of the Battle of Tsushima on 27 May 1905, Itsukushima was the flagship for Vice Admiral Kataoka's 3rd Squadron. Fighting continued past sundown, with the Japanese squadron sinking the repair ship Kamchatka and the battleship . During the first day of the battle, Itsukushima took no damage. After participating in accepting the surrender by Russian Admiral Nebogatov of the remaining ships in the Russian formation on 28 May, Itsukushima began a search for any stragglers who might attempt an escape towards Vladivostok. She returned to patrols in the Korea Strait on 30 May.

On 14 June, Itsukushima was assigned to the force assembled for the invasion of Sakhalin, which took place in July. Afterwards, she was assigned to patrols of Tsugaru Strait and returned to Yokosuka Naval Arsenal for repairs on 26 August. She participated in the naval review celebrating the Japanese victory in Yokohama on 23 October.

On 28 August 1912, Itsukushima was re-classified as a second-class coastal defense vessel, and later used as a submarine tender. She was demilitarized on 1 September 1920 and re-classified as a training hulk. She was struck from the navy list and scrapped on 12 March 1926 at Kure Naval Arsenal.

Notes

References
 
 
 
 
 
 
 
 
 

Matsushima-class cruisers
Ships built in France
1889 ships
Naval ships of Japan
First Sino-Japanese War cruisers of Japan
Russo-Japanese War cruisers of Japan
Maritime incidents in 1897